This is a list of administrators and governors of Kano State.
Kano State was formed on 27 May 1967 when the Northern region was split into Benue-Plateau, Kano, Kwara, North-Central, North-Eastern and North-Western states.

See also
States of Nigeria
List of state governors of Nigeria

References

Kano
Governors